Kameeswarar Temple (also called Kokilamba - Kameeswarar temple or Villianur Temple or Thirukameeswarar temple) is a Hindu temple dedicated to the deity Shiva, located in Villianur, a town in the South Indian union territory of Puducherry. Shiva is worshiped as Kameeswarar, and is represented by the lingam. His consort Parvati is depicted as KokilambaAmman.

The temple complex covers an area of two acres and all its shrines are enclosed with concentric rectangular walls. The temple has a number of shrines, with those of Kameeswarar, his consort KokilambaAmman and Ranganathar being the most prominent.

The temple has six daily rituals at various times from 6:00 a.m. to 8:30 p.m., and many yearly festivals on its calendar. Brahmotsavam, the prime festival during the Tamil month of Aadi (July - August) is the most prominent festival celebrated in the temple.

The original complex is believed to have been built by Cholas, with later additions from different ruling dynasties. In modern times, the temple is maintained and administered by the Hindu Religious and Charitable Endowments Department of the Government of Puducherry.

Legend and history

As per Hindu legend, while Vishnu and Brahma contested for superiority, Shiva appeared as a flame, and challenged them to find his source. Brahma took the form of a swan, and flew to the sky to see the top of the flame, while Vishnu became the boar Varaha, and sought its base. The scene is called lingothbava, and is represented in the western wall at the sanctum of most Shiva temples. Neither Brahma nor Vishnu could find the source, and while Vishnu conceded his defeat, Brahma lied and said he had found the pinnacle. In punishment, Shiva ordained that Brahma would never have temples on earth in his worship. He also asked Brahma to build a temple on the banks of Mutharu River in Thondaimandalam. Brahma built the temple and got relieved of the curse.

The original structure is believed to have been constructed during 12th century, while the later additions are believed to have been built by Medieval Cholas and Vijayanagar Empire, while the present masonry structure was built during the 16th century.

Architecture

Kameeswarar temple is located in Villianur, a village on Puducherry - Villupuram main road. The temple has a flat entrance tower facing South, and all the shrines of the temple are enclosed in concentric rectangular granite walls. The central shrine is approached through pillared halls. The central shrine facing East houses the image of Kameeswarar in the form of Lingam (an iconic form of Shiva). The shrine of KokilambaAmman, facing South, is located in separate shrine around the first precinct. The central shrine is approached through a Mahamandapam and Arthamandapam. As in other Shiva temples in South India, the shrines of Vinayaka, Murugan, Navagraha, Chandekeswara and Durga are located around the precinct of the main shrine. The second precinct has the temple tank and a garden around the periphery of the compound wall.

Literary mention
U V Swaminatha Iyer, the great Tamil scholar obtained the palm manuscripts from his French friend Mulian Vensam and published the book in 1940 titled Villai Puranam written by Veeraraghava Kavi. Arunachala Kavi has written verses revering the importance of the deity Muthukumaraswamy of the temple in the book Villai Muthukumarar Pillai Tamil. Kanchipuram Sababathi Mudaliyar has published a book called Kuyilammai Malai about the temple. There are inscriptions in the temple indicating the establishment of Saiva Math by Meignana Maamunigal Swamigal.

Religious importance and festivals
The temple priests perform the puja (rituals) during festivals and on a daily basis. The temple rituals are performed three times a day; Kalasanthi at 8:00 a.m., Uchikalam at 12:00 a.m. and Sayarakshai at 6:00 p.m. Each ritual comprises four steps: abhisheka (sacred bath), alangaram (decoration), naivethanam (food offering) and deepa aradanai (waving of lamps) for Kameeswarar and Gnanambigai. Unlike other shiva temples, anointing with oil is not performed in the temple. Brahmotsavam, the prime festival during the Tamil month of Aadi (July - August) is the most prominent festival celebrated in the temple.

References

External links

Shiva temples in Puducherry